The Alaska Spotlight was the first African American newspaper in the Territory of Alaska (1912-1959). Publication began in 1952, when Alaska was not yet a state.
It was a weekly newspaper published in Anchorage by George C. Anderson. It ran until the last 1960s. 

According to Wesley (2020), "George C. Anderson arrived after
World War II to work as a linotype operator for the Anchorage Daily News." In 1952, he established The Alaska Spotlight.  Anderson later started another newspaper, The Midnight Sun Reporter (1962-1966).

References

Works cited

African-American history of Alaska
Defunct African-American newspapers
Defunct newspapers published in Alaska
Newspapers established in 1952